Walter Henry Guillebaud, CBE (2 July 1890 – 1 November 1973) was a British civil servant and forester.

Born on 2 July 1890, Guillebaud was the son of the Rev. Erneste Guillebaud (1856–1907), rector of Yatesbury, and Mabel Louise Marshall (1850–1912), a sister of the economist Alfred Marshall. Walter was one of four sons; the elder, Harold, became a missionary, Walter's twin Claude William became a noted economist, and the younger brother Cyril died in 1915. Walter studied at Victoria College, Manchester, and then St John's College, Cambridge.

He was appointed an assistant inspector in the Forestry Branch of the Board of Agriculture in 1914. When the Forestry Commission was established in 1919, he became a research officer and six years later a divisional officer. He was appointed Chief Research Officer in 1928 and Director of Research and Education in 1945, serving until 1948. He was then Deputy Director-General of the Forestry Commission between 1948 and 1953. 

By the late 1940s, Guillebaud had been "the leading figure in forest research since the early twenties". He served as president of the Institute of Foresters of Great Britain from 1945 to 1947 and published ten articles in its journal, Forestry. While possessing a wide range of knowledge about forestry, the forester J. A. B. Macdonald recalled him as "cadaverous in appearance [but] nevertheless gentle, retiring and timid by nature... [h]e was definitely a scholar by preference, and I doubt if there was every much that was really original either about his work or his thoughts". Nevertheless, the Commission paid tribute to him when he died, saying that "his valuable work ... plac[ed] [the Commission's] research efforts on a firm footing". He was appointed a Commander of the Order of the British Empire (CBE) for his service in the 1951 New Year Honours. He died on 1 November 1973.

References 

1890 births
1973 deaths
British civil servants
British foresters
Alumni of the University of Manchester
Alumni of St John's College, Cambridge
Commanders of the Order of the British Empire